Abortion in South Sudan is a criminal offense unless done in good faith for the purpose of saving the life of the
mother.

References 

Health in South Sudan
South Sudan
South Sudan
Women's rights in South Sudan